Yvonne Maria  Karin Margareta Werner  , born Yvonne Karin Margaretha Brorsson ,  on February 28, 1954 in the town of Båstad in Kristianstad County , is a Swedish historian and professor . She currently works at Lund University .

Biography
In 1989 she doctored at Lund University in Swedish-German relations around year 1900. She became a research assistant there in 1992, docent in 1999 and professor in 2008 at Lund University. Werner converted to Catholicism in 1987,  and has especially researched the history of Catholicism in the Nordic countries during the 19th and 20th centuries. She has written numerous works in this area. In her research, she has investigated how moral values change over time and how they look in different societies, as well as how the moral values are conveyed to citizens and how the society reacts to ideological deviants.

Werner has participated in and facilitated several research projects, including the Nordic project The Women's Monastery Movement in the Nordic Region. A feminine counterculture in modern society  , which ended in 2004, and Christian masculinity - a paradox of modernity: Men and religion in a Northern European context 1840-1940,  which lasted until 2010. During the period 2005-2013, Werner was chairwoman the Historical Society in Lund , and she is currently a member of the Science Society in Lund . She has participated in the Swedish Research Council 's Preparatory Group for Historical Sciences, Postdoctoral and Reorganization Panel in several rounds, and has also participated as a reviewer for other scientific councils and foundations in Sweden and in the Nordic region.

In addition to her work, Werner is employed as a tour leader for Catholic places in Italy, such as Assisi and Rome.

Awards and honours
2002 - Royal Swedish History and Antiquity Academy : Uno Lindgren 's award for "outstanding and attentive insight into Catholic missionary history in Sweden"  .

Bibliography (not complete) 
 1996 - Världsvid men främmande. Den katolska kyrkan i Sverige 1873–1929, Katolska bokförlaget 
 1998 - Den frivilliga döden. Samhällets hantering av självmord i historiskt perspektiv, red. Birgitta Odén, Bodil E. B. Persson, Yvonne Maria Werner, Cura förlag 
 2002 - Katolsk mission och kvinnlig motkultur: Sankt Josefsystrarna i Danmark och Sverige 1856–1936, Veritas förlag
 2004 - Nuns and Sisters in the Nordic Countries after the Reformation. A Female Counter-Culture in Modern Society, ed. Yvonne Maria Werner,  Studia Missionalia Svecana LXXXIX 
 2004 - Döden som katharsis. Nordiska perspektiv på dödens kultur och mentalitetshistoria, red. Yvonne Maria Werner, Almqvist & Wiksell 
 2005 - Kvinnligt klosterliv i Sverige och Norden: En motkultur i det moderna samhället, red. Yvonne Maria Werner, Catholica 
 2005 - Nordisk katolicism Katolsk mission och konversion i Danmark i ett nordiskt perspektiv, Makadam förlag
 2008 - Kristen manlighet. Ideal och verklighet 1830–1940, red. Yvonne Maria Werner, Nordic Academic Press 
 2011 - Christian masculinity. Men and religion in northern Europe in the 19th and 20th century, ed. Yvonne Maria Werner, Leuven University Press
 2013 - European Anti-Catholicism in a Comparative and Transnational Perspective, eds. Yvonne Maria Werner and Jonas Harvard, Brill 
 2014 - Katolsk manlighet. Det antimoderna alternativet. Katolska missionärer och lekmän i Skandinavien, Makadam förlag
 2015 - "'Den katolska faran': Antikatolicismen och den svenska nationella identiteten i ett nordiskt perspektiv": Scandia 81:1
 2016 - "Katholische Männlichkeit in Skandinavien": Hg. Michaela Sohn-Kronthaler, Feminisierung oder (Re-)Maskulinisierung der Religion im 19. und 20. Jahrhundert?, Böhlau Verlag
 2016 - "Liturgie und Männlichkeit in der katholischen Mission in Skandinavien": Hg. F. Franziska Metzger & E. Pahud de Mortanges, Orte und Räume des Religiösen im 19.–21. Jahrhundert, Ferdinand Schöningh Verlag
 2017 - "Historiska perspektiv på den katolska kyrkan och demokratin. Signum: Katolsk orientering om kyrka, kultur, samhälle nr 4

References

Notes

External links
List of Publications

1954 births
Living people
Swedish women historians
20th-century Swedish historians
Academic staff of Lund University
21st-century Swedish historians